Gestures is the first CD by the young pianist Maksim Mrvica.  It features works by contemporary Croatian composers. The CD was recorded in Lisinski Studio, sound engineer - Hrvoje Hegedušić, music producer - Dubravko Detoni, executive producer - Xenia Detoni, cover photograph - Damil Kalogjera and design - Ana Nikolić.  It was released in 1999.

Track listing
 Variations on a Theme of Međimurje / Varijacije Na Medimursku Tema   (Mladen Tarbuk)
 A Play of Glass Beads / Igra Staklenih Perli  (Ivo Josipović)
 Moderato misterioso
 Allergro giusto
 Grave
 Allegro molto, ben ritmico
 Presto assai
 Preludij 1./Prelude 1
 Preludij 2./ Prelude 2
 Grave - Prestissimo
 Quasi burlesca
 Presto brillante
 Presto ritmico
 Largo
 Allegro vivo
 Neurosis  (Krešimir Seletković)
 Dance of the Baroness / Ples Barunice  (Frano Parać)
 Gestures/ Geste   (Dubravko Detoni)

1999 classical albums
Maksim Mrvica albums